Dhirendralal Dhar (12 January 1913 – 20 September 1991) was a Bengali writer. In 1979, he received the Indian National Award for his contributions to Children's literature. His pen name was Shridhar Munshi.

Early life
Dhar was born in Kolkata in British India. He studied in Ariya Mission Institution and then in Vidyasagar College. He worked as a part-time journalist and teacher. In 1928, Dhar joined the Non Co-Operation movement and the Indian National Congress. After that he joined the youth organisation of Hindu Mahasabha.

Literary career
Dhar's first published work is Mrityur Poschate in 1934. He was popular for historical, adventure, horror and detective stories or novels specially for children. He edited child magazines like Shishu Pratibha (1955), Ahoroni (1957), Anondo Pujabarshiki (1964–69) and Kishore Granthabali. Apert from these works, he also wrote some novels for adults. Nalanda Theke Lumbini, Kasmira, Pannagarh were his well known novels in Bengali literature. He wrote serious biographies on Subhaschandra Bose, Vidyasagar and Dr. B.R. Ambdekar.

Works
 Adventure Omnibus
 Amar Desher Manush
 Asi Baje Jhan Jhan
 Desh Bidesher Rupkotha
 Durbine Duniya
 Ei Desheri Meye
 Galpo Holeo Satyi
 Joydev
 Juddher Golpo
 Maha Chine Mahasamar
 Mandire Mandire
 Mohakal
 Mohakaler Pujari
 Nalonda Theke Lumbini
 Nilkar Elo Deshe
 Paschim Digante
 Priyadarshi Ashok
 Rongmohol
 Sipahi Juddher Golpo

See also
Akhil Niyogi
Ashapoorna Devi
Khagendranath Mitra
Leela Majumdar
Narayan Gangopadhyay
Premendra Mitra
Shibram Chakraborty
Sukumar Ray

External links
 Dhirendralal Dhar in archive.org

References

1913 births
1991 deaths
Bengali writers
Indian children's writers
Writers from Kolkata
20th-century Indian novelists
Novelists from West Bengal
Vidyasagar College alumni
Bengali detective fiction writers